Morcocytius is a genus of hawkmoths containing only one species, Morcocytius mortuorum, which is known from Brazil, Ecuador, Peru and Bolivia.

The average wingspan is 130–140 mm. Adults have been recorded in October and November in Peru. They feed on the nectar of various flowers.

References

Sphingini
Monotypic moth genera
Moths of South America